"I Wanna", also known in its original version as "I Wonna", was the winning song in the Eurovision Song Contest 2002 performed in English by Marie N representing . With this victory, Latvia became the second (and to date last) Baltic state to win the contest ( had achieved the feat ).

The song was performed twenty-third on the night, following 's Sestre with "Samo ljubezen" and preceding 's Aivaras with "Happy You". At the close of voting, it had received 176 points, placing 1st in a field of 24. The song, however, was a commercial failure both in Latvia and Europe.

Marie (along with Brainstorm lead singer Renārs Kaupers) later hosted the Eurovision Song Contest 2003.

Performance at Eurovision
The song is particularly famous for Marie's performance. She began wearing a white suit and a trilby hat, which was removed by one of her dancers. As the song continued, other dancers removed her suit jacket and her dark shirt, revealing the top of a red dress. The suit trousers were then removed, revealing the bottom half of the short dress. On the final beat of the song, the hem was pulled, revealing the dress to be much longer. This visual performance was also supported by a salsa-style song, which made full use of the more up-beat tempos increasingly finding success in the contest.

Content
The lyrics are relatively simple, with the singer telling her lover that she wants to control their relationship.

Track listing

Charts

References

Eurovision songs of Latvia
Eurovision songs of 2002
Eurovision Song Contest winning songs
2002 songs